Kollam–Thiruvananthapuram trunk line is a railway line in Southern Railway zone connecting the cities of Kollam and Thiruvananthapuram in the state of Kerala, India. The line was opened on 4 January 1918 as the extension of Madras–Quilon line during metre gauge era.

History
South Indian Railway Company has opened the Quilon–Sengottai railway line in 1902 with an intention to connect Quilon (Kollam), the commercial capital of Travancore with Madras. Port of Quilon and the city's commercial reputation has urged the British rulers to connect the city of Quilon with Madras for the smooth transportation of goods including Pepper, Cashew, and spices. Later on 4 January 1918, South Indian Railway Company has opened the Kollam–Thiruvananthapuram extension up to Chala. The terminus was shifted to Trivandrum Central (Thampanoor) and was inaugurated in 1931.

Administration
This line falling under the administrative control of Thiruvananthapuram railway division of the Southern Railway zone  connects with Thiruvananthapuram–Kanyakumari line in South, Kollam–Kayamkulam line in North and Kollam–Punalur–Sengottai line in the East.

Stations

Economy 
Five stations were prominent lying in between Kollam & Thiruvananthapuram posted well above  in annual passenger ticket revenue during the fiscal year 2012-13 and most of their revenue increased during the year 2016–2017.

Services
There are currently 67 pairs of services, including 25 pairs of daily services(4 pairs of passengers, 18 pairs of express trains and 3 pairs of Super Fast trains) plying through Kollam-Thiruvananthapuram line. Kollam Junction is the 2nd busiest railway station in the state in terms of number of services passing through along with trains handled per day and 4th busiest in terms of total annual passengers.

References

External links

Economy of Kollam
Rail transport in Kollam
Transport in Kollam district
Transport in Thiruvananthapuram district
Economy of Thiruvananthapuram
Rail transport in Kerala
5 ft 6 in gauge railways in India
Railway lines opened in 1918

1918 establishments in India